Róbert Gátai (born 26 May 1964) is a Hungarian fencer. He won a bronze medal in the team foil event at the 1988 Summer Olympics.

References

External links
 

1964 births
Living people
Hungarian male foil fencers
Olympic fencers of Hungary
Fencers at the 1988 Summer Olympics
Fencers at the 1992 Summer Olympics
Olympic bronze medalists for Hungary
Olympic medalists in fencing
Fencers from Budapest
Medalists at the 1988 Summer Olympics
20th-century Hungarian people